Jean Talon Street (officially in ) is one of the longest streets on the Island of Montreal. It runs from Decarie Boulevard in the west through Anjou in the east to Galeries d'Anjou. Jean Talon was the first Intendant of New France. In the Town of Mount Royal, it is called Dresden Avenue. In the Montreal Borough of Saint Leonard, it is colloquially known as Via Italia.

Via Italia
Between Viau Boulevard and Langelier Boulevard in the Montreal borough of Saint-Leonard, Jean Talon Street passes through the heart of Montreal's Italian Community and is nicknamed Via Italia. It is home to many Italian Canadian businesses and runs through the largest Italian-Canadian community in Montreal. There are 260,345 people of Italian ancestry living within the Greater Montreal Area.

Transit stations on Jean-Talon Street
Namur
Canora station (REM)
Jean-Talon
Fabre
D'Iberville

Within one block
Acadie
Parc
Parc train station
De Castelnau
Saint-Michel

See also
 141 Jean Talon East
 Canora train station
Little Italy, Montreal
Jean-Talon Market

References

Streets in Montreal
Côte-des-Neiges–Notre-Dame-de-Grâce
Villeray–Saint-Michel–Parc-Extension
Rosemont–La Petite-Patrie
Saint-Leonard, Quebec
Anjou, Quebec